Oscar Estrada (February 15, 1904 – January 2, 1978) was a Major League Baseball pitcher who appeared in one game for the St. Louis Browns in 1929. The left-hander stood 5'8" and weighed 160 lbs.
  
Estrada played in 1924 and 1925 for the integrated Cuban Stars (East) in the Eastern Colored League but most of his baseball career was in Cuba. In 1926 and 1927, Estrada pitched for the Lynn Papooses of the New England League. He played for the Shreveport Sports in 1929.

On April 21, 1929, the 25-year-old Estrada came in to pitch the top of the 9th inning in a home game against the Detroit Tigers at Sportsman's Park. He was the Browns' fourth pitcher in the game, relieving Herb Cobb. He pitched a scoreless inning, although he allowed a hit and a walk, but the Browns lost 16–9. His lifetime ERA stands at 0.00.

Following his brief major league stint, Estrada returned to the Sports. His minor league baseball career continued until , which he split between the Syracuse Chiefs, Greensboro Patriots, and Harrisburg Senators.

He died in his hometown of Havana, Cuba at the age of 73.

Notes

References
Riley, James A. (2002). The Biographical Encyclopedia of the Negro Baseball Leagues. 2nd edition. New York: Carroll & Graf Publ. .

External links
, Baseball-Reference Black Baseball stats, Retrosheet and Seamheads

Major League Baseball pitchers
Major League Baseball players from Cuba
Cuban expatriate baseball players in the United States
Cuban House of David players
Cuban Stars (East) players
Habana players
St. Louis Browns players
1904 births
1978 deaths